Paliavana is a genus of flowering plants belonging to the family Gesneriaceae.

Its native range is Eastern Brazil.

Species
Species:

Paliavana gracilis 
Paliavana plumerioides 
Paliavana prasinata 
Paliavana sericiflora 
Paliavana tenuiflora 
Paliavana werdermannii

References

Gesnerioideae
Gesneriaceae genera